Jean-Georges Vongerichten (born in Alsace, France, on 16 March 1957) is a French chef. Vongerichten owns restaurants in Miami Beach, Las Vegas, London, Paris, Shanghai, and Tokyo, as well as New York's Jean-Georges restaurant and Tangará Jean Georges in São Paulo's luxurious Palácio Tangará, by Oetker Collection. He is also the head chef of Eden Rock, St Barths. Vongerichten is the author of five cookbooks, two with Mark Bittman.

Early life and career 
Born and raised on the outskirts of Strasbourg in Alsace, France, Vongerichten's earliest family memories are about food. The Vongerichten home centered around the kitchen, where each day his mother and grandmother would prepare lunch for the almost 50 employees in their family-owned business. His love for food cemented his choice of career at the age of 16, when his parents brought him to the 3-star Michelin-rated Auberge de l’Ill for a birthday dinner.

Vongerichten began his training soon after in a work-study program at the Auberge de l'Ill as an apprentice to Chef Paul Haeberlin. He went on to work with the top chefs in France, including Paul Bocuse and Louis Outhier at L’Oasis in the south of France. Often working with Outhier, Vongerichten opened 10 restaurants around the world from 1980 to 1985, including the Oriental Hotel in Bangkok, the Meridien Hotel in Singapore, and the Mandarin Hotel in Hong Kong.

Relocation to America 
Vongerichten arrived in the United States in 1985 under the auspices of consulting chef Louis Outhier, opening the Le Marquis de Lafayette restaurant in Boston. A year later he arrived in New York to take over the executive Chef position at Lafayette in the Drake Swissôtel, generating critical acclaim with his innovative interpretation of classical French cuisine and earning four stars from The New York Times at the age of 29.  There he met financiers Bob Giraldi and Phil Suarez, a loyal dining patron.  Vongerichten, Giraldi and Suarez opened a bistro, JoJo, in 1991. JoJo was named Best New Restaurant of the Year, and earned three stars from The New York Times.

Restaurants
United States

International

Vong 
Vongerichten next venture, Vong, paid homage to his passion for the spices and flavors of the East. Using over 150 different herbs and spices to create his take on Thai-inspired French cuisine, its menu impressed critics, earning another three-star review from The New York Times for his "explosive flavorful food. In an adjacent space to Vong, Vongerichten also opened The Lipstick Cafe, catering to the midtown business crowd and serving breakfast and lunch in a casual, upscale setting. The Lipstick Cafe has since closed. In November 2009 it was revealed that Vong was closing at its longtime location indefinitely after it decided not to renew the lease.
Vong was the inspiration for the name of the main antagonists in a popular series of Star Wars novels. A Del Rey Books executive noticed tea from the Yunnan Province on the menu, and combined the two names to create the alien species Yuuzhan Vong.

Starwood Hotels 
Vongerichten and partner Phil Suarez have formed a new company, Culinary Concepts by Jean-Georges, with Starwood Hotels & Resorts Worldwide Inc. and Catterton Partners, a consumer-focused private-equity firm which will own, operate, manage and license restaurants in Starwood properties as well as freestanding concepts not attached to the hotel giant's lodging outlets. The deal calls for seven Spice Markets and other concepts worldwide. The total number of eating destinations could total 56 with this contract. The first to open were Spice Markets at the W Hotel in both Atlanta and Istanbul.

Jean-Georges 
In March 1997, Vongerichten opened Jean-Georges restaurant in the Trump International Hotel and Tower, earning a four star review from The New York Times less than three months after opening, and the "Chef of the Year Award" from John Mariani at Esquire.  Jean-Georges Restaurant also received a three-star rating from the Michelin Guide, an accolade held by the restaurant until 2017, when the restaurant's rating was reduced from three stars to two.

Frank Bruni of the Times said it offers "accessible elegance," providing "classic French indulgence with a contemporary flair." The restaurant trades "the richness of traditional French cooking for a different kind of intensity," he added –it eliminates "thick sauces and embraces oils and broths, preferring them for their lightness and for the way they release their scents, like the perfume of lemon grass that rose from a bath of Asian herbs and seeds around a delicately baked lobster tartine."

Three more Vongs 
A year and a half later, Vongerichten opened a second Vong in the Knightsbridge area of London, earning a three-star review and the 1996 vote for the Evening Standards "Newcomer of the Year." In September 1997, he opened Vong in the Mandarin Oriental Hotel in Hong Kong, which Robb Report awarded "Best Restaurant in the World" award in 1998. A fourth Vong in Chicago, partnering with restaurant corporation Lettuce Entertain You and Geoff Alexander to become VTK (Vong's Thai Kitchen) in 2002. This change was to make the signature Jean-George style available to a wider audience at a more accessible price point. All three additional Vongs, including VTK, have since closed.

The Mercer Kitchen
Vongerichten followed the third Vong with The Mercer Kitchen, in July 1998, in the Mercer Hotel in SoHo. Featuring an American-Provincial menu and ‘communal’ style tables in the open kitchen area, the restaurant is set to close at the end of 2022. The reason Vongerichten gave: "It's been 25 years, a great run."

Prime 
Jean Georges's Prime steakhouse opened in Las Vegas' Bellagio resort in 1998. The steakhouse serves dinner nightly and offers guests patio seating overlooking the Fountains of Bellagio. It is rated Four Diamonds by AAA and serves up 750 varieties of wine paired by certified sommeliers. Prime also features rare cuts of beef such as Kobe A5 and Wagyu beef from Japan.

Spice Market 
In 2004, Vongerichten opened Spice Market, which centered its cuisine around Southeast Asian street food in NYC. It closed in September 2016 due to an increase in rent.

Perry Street 
Perry Street in 2005 (French-American) also in NYC.

Chambers Kitchen 
Chambers Kitchen in Minneapolis opened in 2007.

Matsugen 
In 2008, Vongerichten teamed up with the Matsushita Brothers from Tokyo to open Matsugen. Matsugen's cuisine focuses on Japanese Soba dishes, but also serves sushi and other items, including shabu-shabu and sukiyaki.

J&G Steakhouse (Scottsdale) 
Vongerichten opened his newest steakhouse in December 2008 atop The Phoenician Resort in Scottsdale, Arizona. With fare consisting of steaks and seafood, the restaurant has received 4 stars from the Arizona Republic and is regarded as one of the top 3 steakhouses in the Phoenix/Scottsdale area.

Market 
In November 2009, Vongerichten opened Market in Boston's W Hotel, inspired by the casual, simple elegance of the setting, Jean-Georges has created a relaxed menu that emphasizes fresh, locally produced ingredients. Emphasizing comfort and creativity, the menu reinvents classic dishes with eclectic flair, allowing guests to try new flavor combinations and explore spices from other regions, all while remaining close to home. Dishes crafted with seasonal market ingredients and local fish, can be selected from enticing categories on the menu such as Simply Raw, Fish, Meat, and a Market tasting menu to enliven the senses and satisfy any craving. Market closed in December 2013.  Co-owner Culinary Concepts of New York stated through spokesman Max Buccini: "Due to the rising costs of labor in the hotel landscape in Boston, it became increasingly difficult to operate."

Hotel Shangri-La 
Vongerichten opened a restaurant at the Hotel Shangri-La Vancouver, a luxury hotel that Shangri-La Hotels and Resorts opened in 2009. "Market by Jean-Georges" is the first collaboration between Shangri-La and Vongerichten and is the chef's first involvement with Canadian or west coast dining.

Jean-Georges Steakhouse 
Vongerichten opened a namesake restaurant inside Aria, a casino resort hotel on the Las Vegas Strip. The restaurant features A-5 grade Kobe beef from Hyogo prefecture in Kobe City, Japan, which makes it one of the eight restaurants in the United States to feature the beef.
In May 2017 the Las Vegas steakhouse underwent a two-month renovation. The restaurant made its second debut in July 2017. In addition to an updated ambiance - table side charcuterie service and new craft cocktails are now featured at Jean-Georges Steakhouse.

The Paris Café 
The Paris Café opened on May 15, 2019, along with the opening of TWA Hotel at John F. Kennedy International Airport serving retro type meals similar to meals served on TWA flights when Trans World Airlines was using TWA Flight Center.

ABCV
Jean-Georges's first vegan restaurant is ABCV in Manhattan. The Infatuation rated it 8.5/10 and named it one of NYC's best new restaurants of 2017, writing that "they aren’t out to make a vegetable into something else. There’s no cashew cheese, and nothing is labeled as a 'steak.' They just source great vegetables at the green market and make them into something delicious.

Lawsuit 
In September 2008, Vongerichten agreed to settle a lawsuit for $2.2 million filed by staff who claimed tips from several of his restaurants had been redirected to managers.

Influence 
New York wrote that in the past two decades, no single chef has had more influence on the way New Yorkers dine out—or on the way other chefs cook and other restaurants look. "He invented America’s answer to nouvelle cuisine," says Mario Batali. "When I first came to New York, his book Simple Cuisine was the holy grail for young chefs, and JoJo was the hottest ticket in town."

Vongerichten claims to have invented molten chocolate cake in New York City in 1987, but the French chef and chocolatier Jacques Torres has disputed that, arguing that such a dish already existed in France. According to Vongerichten, he pulled a chocolate sponge cake from the oven before it was done and found that the center was still runny, but was warm and had both a good taste and a good texture.

Personal life 
Jean-Georges currently resides in New York City and is married to a Korean American/African-American actress and model, Marja Vongerichten (née Marja Dominique Allen; born 1976). With Marja, he has a young daughter named Chloe. He also has two adult children, Cedric (who is the Executive chef of Perry Street) and Louise (who recently opened a restaurant called Chefs Club in NY), from his first marriage. His daughter Louise is married to Hamdi Ulukaya. Jean-Georges has three grandchildren. He spends weekends at a house in Waccabuc, New York

Community activism 
Jean-Georges serves on the Food Council at City Harvest, and runs his own foundation called Food Dreams.

Books 
 Home Cooking with Jean-Georges (co-authored with Genevieve Ko) (November 2011), 
 Asian Flavorings of Jean-Georges (October 2007), 
 Simple to Spectacular (co-authored with Mark Bittman) (October 2000), 
 Jean-Georges: Cooking At Home with a Four-Star Chef (co-authored with Mark Bittman) (September 1998), 
 Simple Cuisine: The Easy, New Approach to Four-Star Cooking (1991),

Television 
In 2011, Vongerichten and his wife Marja debuted a PBS television series, Kimchi Chronicles, a travel and cooking show set in South Korea and New York City.

References

External links 
 

1957 births
Living people
People from Bas-Rhin
French chefs
French expatriates in the United States
Head chefs of Michelin starred restaurants
Male chefs
James Beard Foundation Award winners